Berberis temolaica, called the blue barberry, is a species of flowering plant in the genus Berberis, native to Tibet and Myanmar. It has gained the Royal Horticultural Society's Award of Garden Merit.

References

temolaica
Flora of Tibet
Flora of Myanmar
Plants described in 1941